Poropuntius schanicus is a species of ray-finned fish in the genus Poropuntius. It is found in Salween Basin.

References 

Poropuntius
Fish described in 1893
Taxobox binomials not recognized by IUCN